Harlanethis is a small genus of Australian long-jawed orb-weavers. It was first described by A. Álvarez-Padilla, R. J. Kallal and Gustavo Hormiga in 2020, and it has only been found in Australia.  it contains only two species: H. lipscombae and H. weintrauborum.

See also
 List of Tetragnathidae species

References

Tetragnathidae genera
Spiders of Australia